West Union Downtown Historic District is a national historic district located at West Union, Doddridge County, West Virginia. It encompasses 27 contributing buildings that include the commercial and civic core of the town, and surrounding residential buildings. The district includes a number of buildings representative of popular architectural styles from the late-19th century and early-20th century including Romanesque Revival, Neoclassical, and Queen Anne. Notable buildings include the Doddridge County Courthouse (1903) and Jail (1937, now Doddridge County Museum), Scott W. Stuart House (c. 1905), Silas P. Smith House (c. 1903), Town Hall (1893), Droppleman Residence (c. 1917), Michel's Pharmacy (1925). Empire Oil Building (c. 1900), and Myles Manufacturing Co., Inc. (c. 1915). Also located in the district is the separately listed Silas P. Smith Opera House.

It was listed on the National Register of Historic Places in 2003.

References

National Register of Historic Places in Doddridge County, West Virginia
Commercial buildings on the National Register of Historic Places in West Virginia
Houses on the National Register of Historic Places in West Virginia
Historic districts in Doddridge County, West Virginia
Romanesque Revival architecture in West Virginia
Neoclassical architecture in West Virginia
Queen Anne architecture in West Virginia
Houses in Doddridge County, West Virginia
Historic districts on the National Register of Historic Places in West Virginia